Febi Setianingrum (born 29 February 2004) is an Indonesian badminton player affiliated with Djarum Badminton Club. She was invited to be part of Indonesia's national badminton team in 2022.

Career

2022 
In June, Setianingrum with Nethania Irawan won the Lithuanian International after beating fellow Indonesian pair Sofy Al Mushira Asharunissa and Ridya Aulia Fatasya in the final. 

In October, Setianingrum was paired with Jesita Putri Miantoro and lost in the semi-finals of Indonesia Masters Super 100 from 5th seed Japanese pair Rena Miyaura and Ayako Sakuramoto.

2023 
Setianingrum and her partner Jesita Putri Miantoro opened the 2023 season at Iran Fajr International. They won the title defeating Malaysian pair Go Pei Kee and Teoh Mei Xing.

Achievements

BWF International Challenge/Series (2 titles) 
Women's' doubles

  BWF International Challenge tournament
  BWF International Series tournament
  BWF Future Series tournament

BWF Junior International (1 title) 

Girls' doubles

Mixed doubles

  BWF Junior International Grand Prix tournament
  BWF Junior International Challenge tournament
  BWF Junior International Series tournament
  BWF Junior Future Series tournament

Performance timeline

Individual competitions

Senior level

Women's doubles

References 

2004 births
Living people
People from Tangerang
Sportspeople from Banten
Indonesian female badminton players